San Zenone is the Italian name of Zeno of Verona, an Italian Catholic saint.

It may also refer to:

San Zenone al Lambro, a municipality in the Province of Milan, Lombardy
San Zenone al Po, a municipality in the Province of Pavia, Lombardy
San Zenone degli Ezzelini, a municipality in the Province of Treviso, Veneto

See also
 Zenone (disambiguation)
 San Zeno (disambiguation)
 Sanzeno